Don Mason (8 September 1929 – 20 January 1980) was a Canadian actor best known for his leading voice role in Gerry Anderson's Stingray (1964–65) as Captain Troy Tempest.

Selected filmography
O.S.S. as Co-Pilot 
More Deadly than the Male (Film, 1959) as Narrator (voice)
International Detective (TV series, 1961) as Brent/the Foreman
Studio 4 (TV series, 1962) as 1st Officer
Suspense (TV series, 1962) as Co-Pilot
The Forest Rangers (1964) as Steve
Stingray (1964–65) as Captain Troy Tempest (voice)
The Marvel Super Heroes (1966) as Rick Jones
Noah's Animals (TV film, 1976) as Polar Bear (voice)
King of the Beasts (TV film, 1977) as Polar Bear (voice)
Last of the Red-Hot Dragons (TV film, 1980) as Polar Bear (voice)

References

External links

1929 births
1980 deaths
Canadian expatriates in England
Canadian male film actors
Canadian male television actors
Canadian male voice actors
20th-century Canadian male actors